Talwinder Singh Parmar (26 February 1944 – 15 October 1992) was a Sikh Militant known for allegedly masterminding the 1985 Air India Flight 182 bombing, which killed 329 people. He was also the founder, leader, and Jathedar of Babbar Khalsa International, better known as Babbar Khalsa, a Sikh militant group involved in the Khalistan movement.

Parmar founded Babbar Khalsa International alongside Sukhdev Singh Babbar in 1978, and was the leader of its Canadian branch. 

In 1981, he was accused of killing 2 Punjab Police officers and was arrested in 1983 in Germany. He was released in 1984 after which he immediately returned to Canada. 
After the bombing of Air India Flight 182 in 1985, Parmar returned to India and was allegedly killed in a gun fight with Punjab Police on 15 October 1992. He was later named as the mastermind of the 1985 Air India bombing, Canada's worst case of mass murder.

Early life
Parmar was born in Panchhat, Kapurthala, Punjab, India on 26 February 1944. He immigrated to Canada in May 1970, and became a naturalized citizen of Canada when he was in his early twenties.

Militancy
Parmar became involved in the activities of the banned organization Babbar Khalsa International which was founded in 1978, then became its leader in Canada in 1979. After Parmar's return to Canada following his incarceration in West Germany, he embarked on a nationwide tour to establish himself as the pro leading Khalistani Sikh. On July 15, 1984, Parmar strongly urged Sikhs to "unite, fight and kill" in order to punish the Indian government for Operation Blue Star. Operation Blue Star was government response to the militarization and occupation of the Golden Temple, (Harmandir Sahib), in the Indian Punjab by Sikh militants led by Jarnail Singh Bhindranwale.

Allegations of Murder of Punjab Police officers
On 19 November 1981, the Punjab Police were looking for Tarsem Singh Kalasinghian and his accomplices, when on the morning of 19 November 1981 an encounter took place at Daheru village in Ludhiana district in which Police Inspector Pritam Singh Bajwa and Constable Surat Singh of Jalandhar were gunned down. All of the militants hiding in a house of Amarjit Singh Nihang managed to escape. Among those named in the First Information Report (FIR) were Wadhawa Singh (present chief of Babbar Khalsa, now based in Pakistan), Talwinder Singh Parmar, Amarjit Singh Nihang, Amarjit Singh (Head Constable), Sewa Singh (Head Constable) and Gurnam Singh (Head Constable). This is believed to be the first act which gained Babbar Khalsa and its chief, Talwinder Singh Parmar, notoriety. In 1982, India issued a warrant for Parmar's arrest for six charges of murder, stemming from the killing of police officers. 

In 1983, he was arrested in Germany on charges of murdering two police officers in Punjab in 1981. Parmar was acquitted by German authorities and then returned to Canada. India requested for his extradition from Canada, but the request was turned down, and Canada declined to extradite Singh to India.

Babbar Khalsa activities from Canada
During his residence in Canada, Parmar continued to advocate for the Khalistan movement.

Controversy 
Many people have alleged that Talwinder Singh Parmar was unlawfully executed. He was not given any kind of judicial hearing, and sympathizers allege that he did not actually commit any acts of terrorism or bombing. The Indian Government denies such claims. Sympathizers also claim that Talwinder Singh Parmar was killed in a fake encounter with police.

Involvement in the bombing of Air India 182

On 23 June 1985, Air India Flight 182 was bombed. It was a part of an attempted double-bombing which included Air India Flight 301. In March 2005 judgment, Justice Josephson of the British Columbia Supreme Court concluded that one of the leaders of the conspiracy was Talwinder Singh Parmar, belonging to Babbar Khalsa movement. The plane was destined to make its route from Montreal, Canada to New Delhi, India (then called Bombay), over the Atlantic Ocean. All 329 passengers were killed, including 268 Canadian, 27 British and 24 Indian citizens. 

From the time of Parmar's return to Canada following his incarceration in West Germany, he was considered a person of interest to the Canadian authorities. Surveillance on Parmar began as early as 1982, with agents being sent to follow his movements. A warrant under the CSIS Act to intercept communications on Mr. Parmar was sought in the Federal Court and granted commencing March 14, 1985.  

In April 2003, three members of the Vancouver Sikh community – Ajaib Singh Bagri, Ripudaman Singh Malik and Inderjit Singh Reyat were charged. Reyat pleaded guilty to manslaughter, but Bagri and Malik were acquitted. A subsequent commission of inquiry appointed by Canadian Govt and Led by Supreme Court Justice John C. Major submitted its report in 2010. The final report revealed that the Canadian Intelligence Service had Parmar under surveillance prior to the bombing and had also wiretapped him post bombing. Parmar moved to India after the attack but was later killed in an encounter with Indian police before the conclusion of the subsequent inquires and criminal investigations. The report also provided scathing criticism of the CSIS for erasing many of the Parmar's recordings.

Death
Parmar returned to India after the bombing of Air India Flight 182 and was later killed in a gun fight with the Punjab police in 1992.

Alleged confession to Punjab Police in 1992
In July 2007, the investigative magazine Tehelka reported that Parmar may have confessed to the Punjab police during interrogations preceding his death.  He was accused of supplying the dynamite to Lakhbir Singh Rode, a nephew of Jarnail Singh Bhindranwale, who he claimed was the mastermind behind the bombing of Air India Flight 182. Tehelka reported that Singh had been interrogated in India between 9 and 14 October 1992, by senior police officers, where he claimed that the Air India 182 blasts were instigated by Lakhbir Singh Rode.

Retired Punjab Police DSP Harmail Singh Chandi, the key official behind Parmar's arrest at Jammu in September 1992 and his subsequent interrogation before he was killed, eventually came forward with statements from Parmar's confessions. Despite being ordered to destroy these records, he had apparently preserved them in secret. The confession involved Singh's version of the plot:

"Around May 1985, a functionary of the International Sikh Youth Federation came to me and introduced himself as Lakhbir Singh and asked me for help in conducting some violent activities to express the resentment of the Sikhs. I told him to come after a few days so that I could arrange for dynamite and battery etc. He told me that he would first like to see a trial of the blast...After about four days, Lakhbir Singh and another youth, Inderjit Singh Reyat, both came to me. We went into the jungle (of British Columbia). There we joined a dynamite stick with a battery and triggered off a blast. Lakhbir and Inderjit, even at that time, had in their minds a plan to blast an aeroplane. I was not too keen on this plan but agreed to arrange for the dynamite sticks. Inderjit wanted to use for this purpose a transistor fitted with a battery.... That very day, they took dynamite sticks from me and left.

Then Lakhbir Singh, Inderjit Singh and their accomplice, Manjit Singh, made a plan to plant bombs in an Air India (AI) plane leaving from Toronto via London for Delhi and another flight that was to leave Tokyo for Bangkok. Lakhbir Singh got the seat booking done from Vancouver to Tokyo and then onwards to Bangkok, while Manjit Singh got it done from Vancouver to Toronto and then from Toronto to Delhi. Inderjit prepared the bags for the flights, which were loaded with dynamite bombs fitted with a battery and transistor. They decided that the suitcases will be booked but they themselves will not travel by the same flights although they will take the boarding passes. After preparing these bombs, the plan was ready for execution by June 21 or 22, 1985. However, the bomb to be kept in the flight from Tokyo to Delhi via Bangkok exploded at the Narita airport on the conveyor belt. The second suitcase that was loaded on the Toronto-Delhi ai flight exploded in the air." - from alleged confession by Talwinder Singh

After this interrogation, Parmar was killed in an exchange of fire between police and six militants in the early morning of October 15, 1992, near village Kang Arian in Phillaur sub-division.
However, Tehelka claimed that Parmar had been killed while in custody. Tehelka claimed there were discrepancies between the First Information Report (FIR) regarding the incident, and the post-mortem report.  According to the FIR, Parmar was killed by AK-47 fire by SSP Satish K Sharma, firing from a rooftop, at 5:30 AM. The PMR shows that the line of fire of the three bullets are different, which is not possible if one person is firing from a fixed position. Also, the PMR says that the time of death was between 12am and 2am.

The tapes and statements were claimed to have been handed over to the Royal Canadian Mounted Police (RCMP) and the John Major Commission of Inquiry when reinvestigating the Kanishka blast, otherwise known as the bombing of Air India Flight 182. Canadian authorities eventually concluded Parmar was officially responsible for the attacks.

Tehelka reports that "the PHRO's Principal Investigator Sarbjit Singh and lawyer Rajvinder Singh Bains flew to Canada along with Harmail in June and produced their findings before the Commission's counsels".  Official inquiry spokesman Michael Tansey told The Globe and Mail: "We're aware of this article in Tehelka, and we will explore this and any other allegations when the hearings resume in the fall."

References

Khalistan movement people
Indian Sikhs
1944 births
1992 deaths
Air India Flight 182
Indian emigrants to Canada
Punjabi people
Sikh terrorism
People shot dead by law enforcement officers in India
Insurgency in Punjab